"Runaway" is a 1978 song and single by Jefferson Starship, written by Nicholas Q. Dewey for the album Earth. It was the second U.S. Top 40 hit from that album, and was the follow-up to the Top 10 hit "Count On Me". The song peaked at #12 on the U.S. Billboard Hot 100 and number 13 on the Cash Box Top 100.

Cash Box said that "the guitar work is shiny and moody" and "Balin's vocals are alternately smooth and gritty." Record World said that it "finds Marty Balin in fine voice, even sounding a bit like Al Green at times."

In Canada, both "Runaway" and its predecessor peaked at number nine. "Runaway" was the 79th biggest Canadian hit of the year, ranking just six positions behind "Count On Me".

Chart performance

Weekly charts

Year-end charts

Cover versions
Balin released a new version on his 1999 solo album, Marty Balin Greatest Hits.

References

External links
 

1978 songs
1978 singles
Jefferson Starship songs
RCA Records singles